Nemorilla is a genus of flies in the family Tachinidae.

Species
N. chrysopollinis Chao & Shi, 1982
N. floralis (Fallén, 1810)
N. insolens Aldrich & Webber, 1924
N. maculosa (Meigen, 1824)
N. parva (Coquillett, 1897)
N. pyste (Walker, 1849)

References

Exoristinae
Diptera of Europe
Diptera of Asia
Diptera of North America
Tachinidae genera
Taxa named by Camillo Rondani